In machine learning, kernel machines are a class of algorithms for pattern analysis, whose best known member is the support-vector machine (SVM). The general task of pattern analysis is to find and study general types of relations (for example clusters, rankings, principal components, correlations, classifications) in datasets. For many algorithms that solve these tasks, the data in raw representation have to be explicitly transformed into feature vector representations via a user-specified feature map: in contrast, kernel methods require only a user-specified kernel, i.e., a similarity function over all pairs of data points computed using inner products. The feature map in kernel machines is infinite dimensional but only requires a finite dimensional matrix from user-input according to the Representer theorem. Kernel machines are slow to compute for datasets larger than a couple of thousand examples without parallel processing. 

Kernel methods  owe their name to the use of kernel functions, which enable them to operate in a high-dimensional, implicit feature space without ever computing the coordinates of the data in that space, but rather by simply computing the inner products between the images of all pairs of data in the feature space.  This operation is often computationally cheaper than the explicit computation of the coordinates.  This approach is called the "kernel trick". Kernel functions have been introduced for sequence data, graphs, text, images, as well as vectors.

Algorithms capable of operating with kernels include the kernel perceptron, support-vector machines (SVM), Gaussian processes, principal components analysis (PCA), canonical correlation analysis, ridge regression, spectral clustering, linear adaptive filters and many others.

Most kernel algorithms are based on convex optimization or eigenproblems and are statistically well-founded. Typically, their statistical properties are analyzed using statistical learning theory (for example, using Rademacher complexity).

Motivation and informal explanation
Kernel methods can be thought of as instance-based learners: rather than learning some fixed set of parameters corresponding to the features of their inputs, they instead "remember" the -th training example  and learn for it a corresponding weight .  Prediction for unlabeled inputs, i.e., those not in the training set, is treated by the application of a similarity function , called a kernel, between the unlabeled input  and each of the training inputs .  For instance, a kernelized binary classifier typically computes a weighted sum of similarities

,

where

  is the kernelized binary classifier's predicted label for the unlabeled input  whose hidden true label  is of interest;
  is the kernel function that measures similarity between any pair of inputs ;
 the sign function  determines whether the predicted classification  comes out positive or negative.

Kernel classifiers were described as early as the 1960s, with the invention of the kernel perceptron. They rose to great prominence with the popularity of the support-vector machine (SVM) in the 1990s, when the SVM was found to be competitive with neural networks on tasks such as handwriting recognition.

Mathematics: the kernel trick

The kernel trick avoids the explicit mapping that is needed to get linear learning algorithms to learn a nonlinear function or decision boundary. The function  is often referred to as a kernel or a kernel function. The word "kernel" is used in mathematics to denote a weighting function for a weighted sum or integral.

Certain problems in machine learning have more structure than an arbitrary weighting function .  The computation is made much simpler if the kernel can be written in the form of a "feature map"  which satisfies

The key restriction is that  must be a proper inner product.
The alternative follows from Mercer's theorem: an implicitly defined function  exists whenever the space  can be equipped with a suitable measure ensuring the function  satisfies Mercer's condition.

Mercer's theorem is similar to a generalization of the result from linear algebra that associates an inner product to any positive-definite matrix.  In fact,  Mercer's condition can be reduced to this simpler case.  If we choose as our measure the counting measure  for all , which counts the number of points inside the set , then the integral in Mercer's theorem reduces to a summation

The linear interpretation gives us insight about the algorithm. Furthermore, there is often no need to compute  directly during computation, as is the case with support-vector machines. Some cite this running time shortcut as the primary benefit. Researchers also use it to justify the meanings and properties of existing algorithms.

Empirically, for machine learning heuristics, choices of a function  that do not satisfy Mercer's condition may still perform reasonably if  at least approximates the intuitive idea of similarity. Regardless of whether  is a Mercer kernel,  may still be referred to as a "kernel".

If the kernel function  is also a covariance function as used in Gaussian processes, then the Gram matrix  can also be called a covariance matrix.

Applications
Application areas of kernel methods are diverse and include geostatistics, kriging, inverse distance weighting, 3D reconstruction, bioinformatics, chemoinformatics, information extraction and handwriting recognition.

Popular kernels
Fisher kernel
Graph kernels
Kernel smoother
Polynomial kernel
Radial basis function kernel (RBF)
String kernels
Neural tangent kernel
Neural network Gaussian process (NNGP) kernel

See also
Kernel methods for vector output
Kernel density estimation
Representer theorem
Similarity learning
Cover's theorem

References

Further reading

External links
 Kernel-Machines Org—community website
 onlineprediction.net Kernel Methods Article

Kernel methods for machine learning
Geostatistics
Classification algorithms